John Grimes may refer to:
Dr. John Grimes (1802–1875), Quaker anti-slavery advocate
John Grimes (New Zealand bishop) (1842–1915), first Roman Catholic bishop of Christchurch, New Zealand
John Grimes (bishop) (1852–1922), Roman Catholic bishop
John Bryan Grimes (1868–1923), North Carolina Democratic politician and farmer
John Grimes (baseball) (1869–1964), American baseball player
John Grimes (priest) (1881–1976), Anglican Archdeacon of Northampton
John Grimes, former U.S. Assistant Secretary of Defense for Networks and Information Integration (2005-2009)
John Grimes (singer) (born 1991), member of the Irish pop rap duo Jedward
John Grimes, fictional character in a series of novels by A. Bertram Chandler
John Grimes, fictional character in the film Black Hawk Down

See also
Jack Grimes (disambiguation)